Inocyclus is a genus of fungi in the family Parmulariaceae.

References

External links
Inocyclus at Index Fungorum

Parmulariaceae